The Lozna is a left tributary of the river Someș in Romania. It discharges into the Someș in the village Lozna.

References

Rivers of Romania
Rivers of Sălaj County